Regional elections were held in Denmark on 14 March 1950. 11499 municipal council members were elected, as well as 299 members of the counties (Danish, amter, singular, amt) of Denmark.

Results of regional elections
The results of the regional elections:

Amt Councils

Municipal Councils

References

1950
Denmark
Elections